Ace of Clubs was a record label founded by British Decca in 1959 for reissuing low-priced, classical, early jazz and popular music in Europe. Its partner label, Ace of Hearts Records, issued music from the U.S.

References

See also
 List of record labels

Defunct record labels of the United Kingdom
Reissue record labels
Jazz record labels